The Slovakia national futsal team is controlled by the Slovak Football Association, the governing body for futsal in Slovakia and represents the country in international futsal competitions, such as the World Cup and the European Championships.

Competition history

FIFA Futsal World Cup
 1989 - did not compete
 1992 - did not compete
 1996 - did not qualify
 2000 - did not qualify
 2004 - did not qualify
 2008 - did not qualify
 2012 - did not qualify
 2016 - did not qualify
 2021 - did not qualify

UEFA Futsal Championship
 1996 - did not compete
 1999 - did not qualify
 2001 - did not qualify
 2003 - did not qualify
 2005 - did not qualify
 2007 - did not qualify
 2010 - did not qualify
 2012 - did not qualify
 2014 - did not qualify
 2016 - did not qualify
 2018 - did not qualify
 2022 - 8th place (Quarter-finals)

Futsal Mundialito
 1994 – did not compete
 1995 – did not compete
 1996 – did not compete
 1998 – did not compete
 2001 – did not compete
 2002 – did not compete
 2006 – did not compete
 2007 – did not compete
 2008 – did not compete

Current squad 
The following players were called up for UEFA Futsal Euro 2022.

References

External links
Official website

Slovakia
National sports teams of Slovakia
Futsal in Slovakia